The U.S. Highways in Massachusetts comprise eight current U.S. Highways and one former route.

Mainline routes

Special routes

See also

References

U.S. Highways